This is a list of food and drink magazines. This list also includes food studies journals.

Food and drink magazines

 The Arbuturian
 L'Art culinaire
 Bon Appétit
 Food & Beverage Magazine
 Buffé
 Cherry Bombe
 Cocina
 Cooking Light
 Cook's Illustrated
 La Cucina Italiana
 Cuisine La Cuisinière Cordon Bleu Dark Rye The Drinks Business Everyday Food FDA Consumer Feel Good Food Fine Cooking Food & Wine Food Network Magazine Foodies Goodtoknow Recipes Gourmet Traveller Imbibe INOUT Lucky Peach Meatpaper Olive Le Pot au Feu Relish Restaurant Restaurant Insider Saveur Spirit Journal Sunset Tandoori Magazine Taste of Home VegNews Woman's Day Zester DailyBeer and pub magazines
 All About Beer Draft Magazine Morning Advertiser The PublicanFood studies journals

 African Journal of Food, Agriculture, Nutrition and Development The American Journal of Clinical Nutrition Appetite Comprehensive Reviews in Food Science and Food Safety Food and Bioprocess Technology Food & History Food Quality and Preference Food Science and Technology International Food Structure Gastronomica: The Journal of Food and Culture Innovative Food Science and Emerging Technologies International Journal of Food Sciences and Nutrition Journal of Food Biochemistry Journal of Food Process Engineering Journal of Food Processing and Preservation Journal of Food Quality Journal of Food Safety Journal of Food Science The Journal of Food Science Education Journal of Sensory Studies Journal of Texture Studies Lebensmittel-Wissenschaft & Technologie Petits Propos Culinaires Trends in Food Science and TechnologyWine magazines

 American Winery Guide Australian and New Zealand Wine Industry Journal Canadian Wine Annual Cocina Decanter Food & Wine Gambero Rosso Harpers Magazine (trade publication)
 Quarterly Review of Wines La Revue du vin de France Sommelier India Sommelier Journal Spirit Journal The Wine Advocate Wine & Spirit Wine & Spirits Wine Enthusiast Wine Spectator Wines & Vines The World of Fine Wine''

See also
 List of books about food and drink
 List of films about food and drink
 List of magazines
 List of websites about food and drink

References

 
Food and drink
magazines